UU Aurigae is a carbon star in the constellation Auriga.

Description

UU Aurigae is a carbon-rich asymptotic giant branch star. The spectral type listed in the General Catalogue of Variable Stars (GCVS) is C5,3-C7,4(N3). The N3 refers back to an older type of classification where carbon stars were given spectral types of N or R, although the numeric index was correlated more with the strength of the carbon chemistry rather than temperature. The C5 to C7 indicates various classifications using the newer Morgan-Keenan system where the numeric index corresponds better to the temperature of the star. C5 to C7 types are approximately equivalent to early-M stars. The second numeric index, 3 or 4 for UU Aurigae indicates the strength of the Swan bands in the spectrum, on a scale of 1 to 5. Using the more modern revised Morgan-Keenan scheme, a spectral type of C-N5- C2 6- has been published, with the C-N5 indicating an N-type carbon star with a temperature index of 5-, and a Swan band strength of 6- on a scale of 1 to 8.

UU Aurigae is classified as a semiregular variable of type SRb, indicating it is a giant star with poorly defined variations. Its brightness varies from magnitude +4.9 to +7.0 in visual apparent magnitude. The period is given in the GCVS as 441 days, but there is also a strong variation with a period of 235 days. Using British Astronomical Association observations from 1971 to 1998, the periods are calculated as 439.4 and 233.1 days.

The angular diameter of UU Aurigae has been measured at 12.07 ± 0.22 mas using very-long-baseline interferometry (VLBI). Around the star is a shell of dust made up largely of amorphous carbon and silicon carbide (SiC), with the SiC appearing at three times the star's radius and the amorphous carbon at nine times its radius. Further out is a carbon-rich shell at 300 stellar radii and two oxygen-rich shells even further away. UU Aurigae also has a bow shock 0.14 parsec wide, created by its motion through the interstellar medium.

References

External links
 HR 2405
 CCDM J06365+3827
 Image UU Aurigae

046687
031579
Auriga (constellation)
Semiregular variable stars
Carbon stars
Aurigae, UU
Asymptotic-giant-branch stars
2405
Durchmusterung objects